This is a list of museums, galleries and interpretive centers in the Louisville metropolitan area.

Art 

 21c Museum Hotel
 Carnegie Center for Art & History (New Albany, Indiana)
 KMAC Museum
 Speed Art Museum

Regional history 

 Falls of the Ohio State Park interpretive center, a museum covering the natural history related to findings in the nearby exposed Devonian fossil beds as well as the human history of the Louisville area
 The Filson Historical Society, features a museum and extensive historical collections, currently undergoing major expansion
 Frazier History Museum
 Historic Locust Grove Visitors Center, which includes a museum
 Howard Steamboat Museum (Jeffersonville, Indiana)
 Kentucky Derby Museum
 Kentucky Railway Museum (New Haven)
 Louisville Slugger Museum & Factory
 My Old Kentucky Home State Park (Bardstown)
 Portland Museum
 Riverside, The Farnsley-Moremen Landing Visitors Center, which includes a museum
 Thomas Edison House
 Whitney Young Birthplace and Museum

Bourbon

 Evan Williams Bourbon Experience, located on Louisville's Whiskey Row, featuring bourbon history and tastings, and interprets Louisville's wharf history in the 1790s
 Heaven Hill Distilleries Bourbon Heritage Center (Bardstown)
 Jim Beam American Stillhouse (Clermont)
 Oscar Getz Museum of Whiskey History (Bardstown)
 Stitzel-Weller Distillery (Shively)

Cities

 Bardstown Historical Museum (Bardstown)
 Corydon Capitol State Historic Site (Corydon, Indiana)
 Historic Middletown Museum
 Jeffersontown Historical Museum (Jeffersontown)

Counties

 The Bullitt County History Museum (Shepherdsville)
 Clark County Museum (Jeffersonville, Indiana)
 Henry County Historical Society (New Castle)
 Oldham County History Center (La Grange)

More regional historical collections can be found at the Louisville Free Public Library and the University of Louisville.

U.S. and world history 

 Museum of the American Printing House for the Blind
 Civil War Museum (Bardstown), including the Civil War Museum of the Western Theater, Pioneer Village, Women's Civil War Museum, War Memorial of Mid America and the Wildlife Museum
 John Hay Center
 Louisville Slugger Museum & Factory, showcases the history of the Louisville Slugger and baseball in general
 National Society of the Sons of the American Revolution, features a historical museum and a genealogical collection
 General George Patton Museum of Leadership (Fort Knox)

Other subjects 

 Kentucky Science Center, hands-on science museum featuring a four-story digital theater
 Louisville WaterWorks Museum, located at the Louisville Water Tower
 Muhammad Ali Center
 Schimpff's Candy Museum (Jeffersonville)
 Thomas Merton Center

See also 

 List of attractions and events in the Louisville metropolitan area

References 

Lists of museums in the United States by city
 
Museums
Museums in Louisville
Museums in Louisville